The Khlong Kui is a river in Thailand.

Geography
Khlong Kui drains into the Gulf of Thailand from the Malay Peninsula in Thailand. It flows through Ban Pong Kasang and Ban Thung Faek, Kui Buri District, Prachuap Khiri Khan Province.

References

Kui